Amélie Rose Françoise Gex (October 24, 1835 in La Chapelle-Blanche, Savoie – June 16, 1883 in Chambéry) was a Savoyard writer and poet who created works in French and Franco-Provençal (Arpitan). Until 1880, she published most of her writings under the pen name Dian de la Jeânna.

Biography

Amélie Gex was the daughter of the physician  and winemaker <ref>Chez vous, à La Ravoire, n°9, 1979. Au sujet de l'origine des noms de rues", par Marcel Gianada. Il est bien précisé "médecin et viticulteur")</ref> Marc-Samuel Gex.  Her mother died when she was 4 years old.  She first lived in Chambéry then Challes-les-Eaux with her grandmother.  At fourteen, she moved back to La Chapelle-Blanche with her father.

Upon the formation of the Kingdom of Italy in 1861, Gex, like many Liberals who preferred the Italian Cavour to Napoleon III of France, supported King Victor Emmanuel II.  She later became Republican, and entered politics, writing speeches in dialect to better speak to rural voters.

Gex began writing during the years 1872-75.  After the death of her father in 1876, she operated her family's estate, then returned to live in Chambéry, where she lived modestly.

In 1877, the Republican newspaper Le Père André  began publishing her poetry under the pen name Dian de la Jeânna ("John son of Jane").  She continued publishing under this name in Le Père André from March 1879 until May 1880, then in L'Indicateur savoisien from 1879 to 1882.  Her poems are devoted to vineyards, farmers and the Savoy.  They evoke the harvest, threshing with a flail, and the cycles of nature that motivate people to work.

Gex also wrote short stories. In "Dit de la couleuvre" ("Tale of the Snake"), she reworks the story of the Queen of Sheba, who rode a flying serpent to marry Solomon.  In "Dit du Château mort" ("Tale of Castle Death"), she evokes a pagan country castle near Mont Blanc haunted by a flaming sword turning in the air.  Deciding that politics should give way to work, she also strove to write stories in French to expand her readership.

In 1882, she was honored by the Academy of Savoy for her work.
 
She died of an illness in 1883.

Selected works

 1878, Le long de l'An, chansons en patois savoyard, avec la traduction française en regard, Imp. C.-P. Ménard, Chambéry
 1879, Reclans de Savoué, Les Echos de Savoie, Imp. C.-P. Ménard, Chambéry
 1880, Poésies, Imp. C.-P. Ménard, Chambéry
 1882, Lo cent ditons de Pierre d'Emo, Imp. C.-P. Ménard, Chambéry
 1882, À une âme sincère, Imp. C.-P. Ménard, Chambéry
 1885, Vieilles gens et vieilles choses : Histoire de ma rue de mon village, quatre contes
 1894, Feuilles mortes, Imp. C.-P. Ménard, Chambéry
 1898, Fables, Imp. C.-P. Ménard, Chambéry

Bibliography
 Charles Buet (1889), Le Parnasse contemporain savoyard, Thonon: Charles Buet & Impremerie de la Société Anonyme de l'Union Chablaisienne. 
 Jolanda (1909), Il bardo della Savoia (Amélie Gex), Lugano: Casa editrice del « Coenobium ». 
 F. Vermale (1923), Un Poète Savoyard, Amélie Gex (1835-1883). Notes biographiques et correspondance, Chambéry: Librairie Dardel, Chambéry. 
 David Oscar (1926), Amélie Gex, Éditions revues du Lac d'Annecy. 
 Augusta Abry (1942), Notre patois et nos poètes patoisants, Rumilly: Éd. J. Ducret 
 Amis d'Amélie Gex (1955), Vieilles gens et vieilles choses  : histoires de ma rue et de mon village. Amélie Gex, préf. Henry Bordeaux, Paris: Éd. Jean Portail 
 Amélie Gex, trad. Armanda Grazini (1989), Vecchia gente e vecchie cose : storie della mia strada e del mio villaggio,  Siena: Siena - universita. 
 Philippe Terreaux (1990), La Savoie jadis et naguère : d'Amélie Gex à Henry Bordeaux'', Geneva: Éditions Slatkine, 201 pages.

References

External links

Works online
 "Dian de la Jeânna" (Amélie Gex, 1878), Le long de l'An : Chansons en payois sayoyard, BnF Gallica
 "Dian de la Jeânna" (Amélie Gex, 1879), Reclans de Savoué, BnF Gallica
 Amélie Gex (1880), Poésies, BnF Gallica
 Amélie Gex (1885), Vieilles gens et vieilles choses : histoires de ma rue et de mon village, BnF Gallica

Other links

Text
 Biography at Sabaudia.org (French)
 Biographical note, Consulate General of Savoy (French)
 Bibliographies, Amélie Gex at Librairie Le Beau Livre.com, list of complete works

Media files
 Mediatheque Valais - Martigny, En Savoie: Amélie Gex et l'Institut Gardette de Lyon, Terrapon, Michel (1987), mpeg file 
  Mediatheque Valais - Martigny, Hommage à Amélie Gex, Terrapon, Michel (1986), mpeg file 
  Mediatheque Valais - Martigny, Léon l'Homme - Petit florilège francoprovençal, Terrapon, Michel (1993), mpeg file 

1835 births
1883 deaths
People from Savoie
French poets
19th-century poets
Franco-Provençal-language poets